Roman Zdzisław Jerzy Sabiński (28 December 1908 – 28 June 1978) was a Polish ice hockey player who competed in the 1932 Winter Olympics.

He was born in Lemberg, Austro-Hungarian Empire.

In 1932 he was a member of the Polish ice hockey team which finished fourth in the Olympic tournament. He played all six matches.

After World War II, in which he fought in the Polish Army, Sabiński emigrated to the United Kingdom. He died in Manchester.

External links
 profile 
 Roman Sabiński's profile at Sports Reference.com

1908 births
1978 deaths
Sportspeople from Lviv
People from the Kingdom of Galicia and Lodomeria
Polish Austro-Hungarians
Olympic ice hockey players of Poland
Ice hockey players at the 1932 Winter Olympics
Polish military personnel of World War II
Polish emigrants to the United Kingdom